The Fencing Master is a 1992 Spanish film based on the 1988 novel of the same name by Arturo Pérez-Reverte. The film was selected as the Spanish entry for the Best Foreign Language Film at the 65th Academy Awards, but was not accepted as a nominee.

Awards
The film won three Goya Awards : Best Costume Design, Best Adapted Screenplay (by Taco Larreta) and Best Film Music.

Cast 
 Omero Antonutti - Don Jaime Astarloa
 Assumpta Serna - Adela de Otero
 Joaquim de Almeida - Luis de Ayala
 José Luis López Vázquez - Jenaro Campillo

See also
 List of submissions to the 65th Academy Awards for Best Foreign Language Film
 List of Spanish submissions for the Academy Award for Best Foreign Language Film

References

External links 
 
 

1992 films
Films directed by Pedro Olea
Films based on Spanish novels
Films based on works by Arturo Pérez-Reverte
Films set in the 1860s
Spanish swashbuckler films
1990s Spanish-language films
1990s Spanish films